Hanusará is a small river in the village of Sørvágur on the Faroe Islands. Hanusará translates to 'the river of Hanus'. Hanus is a Faroese male name, but it is unclear whom the river is named after.

The first settlements in Sørvágur were alongside this small river.

Rivers of the Faroe Islands